Trapananda can refer to:
Trapananda National Reserve
City of the Caesars